The Lhasa Great Mosque, also known as Hebalin Mosque, is a mosque in Lhasa, Tibet Autonomous Region, China.

History
The mosque was originally built in 1716. The mosque was further expanded in 1793. Soon after being destroyed by Tibetan mobs during the 1959 Tibetan uprising, the mosque was rebuilt and renovated. During the Cultural Revolution, the mosque was repurposed as a committee office and agriculutal co-operative site. In 1978, the mosque was reinstated as a religious space. During the 2008 Tibetan unrest, a mob burned the mosque.

Architecture
The mosque has a three-entrance courtyard which covers a total area of 2,600 m2. The buildup area covers an area of 1,300 m2 which consists of the prayer hall, Pai building, bunker building, ablution hall, bathroom and other facilities. The prayer hall is located in the west which covers an area of 285 m2 which consists of inner hall, open hall and main platform. The building architecture is the traditional Zang architecture style and also combines religious and local features.

See also
 Islam in China
 Tibetan Muslims
 List of mosques in China

References

1716 establishments in Tibet
Buildings and structures in Lhasa
Religious buildings and structures completed in 1716